A constitutional referendum was held in Chad and Ubangi-Shari on 13 October 1946 as part of the wider French constitutional referendum. The proposed new constitution was rejected by 77.3% of voters, with a turnout of 64.5%. However, the constitution was approved by a majority of voters in the overall results.

Results

References

1946 referendums
October 1946 events in Africa
1946 2
1946 in Ubangi-Shari
1946 2
1946 in Chad
1946 2
Referendums in Ubangi-Shari
Constitutional referendums in France